Mikhail Semyonovich Svetin (born Michail Solomonovitch Goltsman; 11 December 1929 – 30 August 2015) was a Soviet, Russian actor. He appeared in more than fifty films.

Biography 
Born in Kyiv, he was the first child in the family. His father, Solomon Mykhailovych Holtsman, worked as a laborer at the Kyiv Film Factory, and his mother, Hanna Petrivna, was a housewife. He graduated from the Kyiv Music College. 

In 1964-1970, he worked at the Kyiv Musical Comedy Theater. 

In 1970, he began working at the Maly Drama Theater in Leningrad. Since 1980, he has been an actor at the Akimov Comedy Theater in Leningrad. 

Svetin's film career began in 1973 with a role in the movie "Not a Year to Go". Among Svetin's most famous works in cinema are his roles in the films Athos, It Can't Be! 

In 1987, Svetin was awarded the title of Honored Artist of the RSFSR, and in 1996 he became People's Artist of Russia. In 2009, Svetin received the Order of Merit for the Fatherland, IV degree. 

He has acted in Ukrainian films: "Neither Feather nor Fluff!" (1974), "Captain Crocus and the Secret of the Little Conspirators" (1991), "The Golden Chicken" (1993, "Marshmallows in Chocolate" (1994, "Object Jay" (1995), "Day of the Vanquished" (2009), "The True Story of the Scarlet Sails" (2010) and others. 

In August 2015, he was hospitalized with a preliminary diagnosis of stroke. He died on the morning of August 30 in the intensive care unit of the Gatchina Central District Hospital.

Selected filmography

References

External links
 

1929 births
2015 deaths
Actors from Kyiv
Soviet male film actors
Soviet male television actors
Ukrainian male film actors
Ukrainian male television actors
20th-century Ukrainian male actors
21st-century Ukrainian male actors
Recipients of the Order of Honour (Russia)
People's Artists of Russia
Soviet Jews
Ukrainian Jews
Burials at Serafimovskoe Cemetery
Jewish Russian actors
R. Glier Kyiv Institute of Music alumni